Javier Antonio Martínez (born February 5, 1977) was a Major League Baseball pitcher.

Drafted by the Chicago Cubs in the 3rd round of the 1994 MLB amateur draft, Martínez made his Major League Baseball debut with the Pittsburgh Pirates on April 2, 1998, and appeared in his final game on September 27, 1998, though he continued to play for various minor league teams through .

See also
 List of Major League Baseball players from Puerto Rico

External links

1977 births
Living people
Altoona Curve players
Bowie Baysox players
Bridgeport Bluefish players
Chattanooga Lookouts players
Dayton Dragons players
Daytona Cubs players
Gulf Coast Cubs players
Hickory Crawdads players
Huntington Cubs players
Jackson Senators players
Major League Baseball pitchers
Major League Baseball players from Puerto Rico
Mudville Nine players
Ottawa Lynx players
Sportspeople from Bayamón, Puerto Rico
Pittsburgh Pirates players
Puerto Rican expatriate baseball players in Canada
Rockford Cubbies players
Stockton Ports players